HMS Leviathan was a 74-gun third-rate ship of the line of the British Royal Navy, launched on 9 October 1790.

Service history
At the Battle of Trafalgar under Henry William Bayntun, she was near the front of the windward column led by Admiral Lord Nelson aboard his flagship, and captured the Spanish ship . A flag said to have been flown by the Leviathan at Trafalgar is to be sold at auction by Arthur Cory in March 2016 - Bayntun is thought to have given it to his friend the Duke of Clarence (later William IV), who then gave it to Arthur Cory's direct ancestor Nicholas Cory, a senior officer on William's royal yacht , in thanks for helping the yacht win a race and a bet.

Leviathan, and  shared in the proceeds of the capture on 10 September 1797 of the Tordenskiold.

In 1809, she took part in the Battle of Maguelone.

On 27 June 1812, Leviathan,  and  attacked an 18-strong French convoy at Laigueglia and Alassio in Liguria, northern Italy.

Fate
In 1816, after the end of the Napoleonic Wars, she was converted into a prison ship and in 1848 was sold and broken up.

Notes

References

Lavery, Brian (2003) The Ship of the Line - Volume 1: The development of the battlefleet 1650–1850. Conway Maritime Press. .

External links
 

Ships of the line of the Royal Navy
Courageux-class ships of the line
Ships built in Chatham
1790 ships